This is a list of vice-chancellors of the University of Malaya.

References

Vice-chancellors
Malaya
Malaya